St. Paul Downtown Airport , also known as Holman Field, is an airport just across the Mississippi River from downtown Saint Paul, Minnesota.  It is one of several reliever airports in the Twin Cities operated by the Metropolitan Airports Commission. The airport has three runways and serves aircraft operated by corporations in the local area, a flight training school and the Minnesota Army National Guard aviation unit, as well as transient general aviation aircraft.

The airport is home to an installation of the Minnesota Army National Guard. Two properties at the airport are listed on the National Register of Historic Places: the 1939 Holman Field Administration Building and the 1942 Riverside Hangar.

History
Holman Field was named for Charles W. "Speed" Holman (1898–1931), who was a stunt pilot, barnstormer, wing walker, parachutist, airmail pilot, aviation record holder and airline pilot. Born in Bloomington, he was the first pilot hired by Northwest Airways in 1926. In 1928, Holman set a world record of 1,433 consecutive loops in an airplane in five hours over the St. Paul Airport. He died in an accident during an air show in Omaha in 1931 at the age of 32.

During World War II, Northwest Airlines employed up to 5,000 people at the site, modifying new B-24 Liberator bombers, some of which received the highly classified H2X radar, which proved to be an invaluable tool in the European theater.

The terminal was used as a backdrop for scenes in the 1972 film Slaughterhouse-Five.

During the 1970s and early 1980s, commuter airline Lake State Airways offered scheduled airline service between the St. Paul Downtown Airport and Minneapolis–St. Paul International Airport in Minnesota. It cost $5USD for a one-way ticket between the two airports, and $10 round-trip.  Capitol Air flew MDW-STP with a Swearingen Metroliner for roughly a year starting in December 1993.

Facilities and aircraft

For the 12-month period ending December 31, 2014, the airport had 66,475 aircraft operations, an average of 182 per day: 74% general aviation, 15% military and 11% air taxi. In January 2017, there were 68 aircraft based at this airport: 20 single-engine, 12 multi-engine, 18 jet, 7 helicopter and 11 military.

Annual aircraft operations

Based on annual reports and data released by the Metropolitan Airports Commission, aircraft operations declined 65.3% in the decade 2011-2020.

Charter Airlines

Cargo airlines

Flood wall considerations
Recently local debate has ensued over plans to build a flood wall around the airport.  In 1993, 1997, and 2001, the airport was flooded due to its proximity to the Mississippi River.  Supporters do not want to deal with the future inconvenience of having to deal with the flood again, while critics say that the proposed wall would ruin views and make the airport "ugly". A dike to protect the airport from the nearby river was considered since the National Guard stated that they may leave if the dike is not constructed in a timely manner.

In 2009, a removable flood wall was installed that is only erected when flooding is imminent, leaving the views of the river intact for the rest of the year. Steel plates are embedded in the concrete on the river side of the runways. The flood wall is composed of steel posts that anchor to the embedded plates and aluminum planks that are stacked between the posts to form a flood barrier. These are then removed and stored when the flood event has passed.

Gallery

See also

 Minnesota World War II Army Airfields

References

External links
MSP Reliever Airports: St. Paul Downtown Airport
 

Historic American Engineering Record (HAER) documentation, filed under Saint Paul, Ramsey County, MN:

Airports in Minnesota
Historic American Engineering Record in Minnesota
Transportation buildings and structures in Saint Paul, Minnesota
Airfields of the United States Army Air Forces Technical Service Command
Airfields of the United States Army Air Forces in Minnesota